The 2010 Utah Blaze season is the 4th season for the franchise in the Arena Football League. The team was coached by Ernesto Purnsley, who was fired on June 1, 2010, with Ron James named as his replacement. Home games are played at the Maverik Center, which was known as the "E Center" prior to being renamed on June 8, 2010. The Blaze missed out on the postseason after finishing the season 2–14, the worst record in the league.

Standings

Regular season schedule

The Blaze did not open their season in the league's opening week, but instead in Week 2 at home against the Shock on April 9. They visited the Vipers on July 31 for their final regular season game.

All times are EDT

Final roster

Regular season

Week 1: BYE

Week 2: vs. Spokane Shock

The Blaze did not open the season well, never scoring more than twice in any quarter during the game. Quarterback Michael Affleck completed only 4 passes for 42 yards by halftime. At halftime the Blaze trailed 35–14. Brett Elliott replaced Affleck at the start of the 3rd quarter. Elliott fared slightly better, completing 10 of 17 passes for 122 yards and 2 touchdowns, but it was not enough to get the Blaze back into the game, as they lost to the former AF2 team by 34 points.

Week 3: vs. Alabama Vipers

Utah came up short in a game that featured several lead changes. Both teams exchanged touchdowns until the Vipers had consecutive scores in the 3rd quarter. The Blaze were able to cut the deficit to 49–46 going into the 4th quarter, but did not score again until the final minute of the game. By that time, the game out of reach, and the Blaze dropped to 0–2. Brett Elliott, who came into the previous week's game after halftime, got the start in this game, throwing for 231 yards and 4 touchdowns. None of Utah's receivers caught for over 100 yards.

Week 4: at Chicago Rush

The Blaze remained winless after being defeated by the undefeated Rush. Utah was the first to score in the game, but it was their only lead of the night. The Rush answered with a 34-yard touchdown pass to tie, and took the lead on a 1-yard run following a blocked field goal attempt by Utah. At halftime, the Blaze trailed 28–14. In the 3rd quarter, after an onside kick by the Rush following another touchdown went out of bounds, the Blaze scored a touchdown on the very next play, cutting the deficit to 35–20, but it was the closest they would get to Chicago, eventually losing by a final score of 63–40. Brett Elliott finished with 316 passing yards and 5 touchdowns. Chris Francies was the leading receiver with 129 yards on 9 receptions and 3 touchdowns.

Week 5: vs. Bossier–Shreveport Battle Wings

The Blaze earned their first win of the year by defeating the Battle Wings, thanks in part to their defense. With a 24–20 lead in the 2nd quarter, Bossier–Shreveport looked to take the lead on what would be their last drive of the 1st half. Facing a 4th down just 2 yards away from the end zone, the Battle Wings got a new set of downs following a costly pass interference penalty by the Blaze defense. However Utah was able to keep the Battle Wings out of the end zone with a goal-line stand. Missing a field goal on the last play of the quarter, the score remained 24–20 at halftime. On the Battle Wings' first drive of the 3rd quarter, the Blaze came up with an interception, and the offense capitalized on the takeaway with a touchdown. The defense continued to come up with stops in the 4th quarter which allowed the offense to continue to build on its lead and secure the victory. Brett Elliott threw for 237 yards and had 8 total touchdowns in the game. With 97 yards and 2 touchdowns, Chris Francies was the leading receiver.

Week 6: BYE

Week 7: at Milwaukee Iron

Week 8: at Spokane Shock

Week 9: vs. Arizona Rattlers

Week 10: at Cleveland Gladiators

Week 11: vs. Chicago Rush

Week 12: vs. Tampa Bay Storm

Week 13: at Iowa Barnstormers

Week 14: vs. Milwaukee Iron

Week 15: vs. Jacksonville Sharks

Week 16: at Arizona Rattlers

Week 17: at Dallas Vigilantes

Week 18: at Alabama Vipers

References

Utah Blaze
Utah Blaze seasons
Utah